is a private junior college located in the city of Aomori, Japan. Originally a women's college, it became coeducational in April 1974.

Departments
 Department of Food Nutrition
 Department of Early Education
 Department Nursing
 Department of Caregiving

See also 
 List of junior colleges in Japan

External links
 Aomori Chuo Junior College

Educational institutions established in 1970
Private universities and colleges in Japan
Universities and colleges in Aomori Prefecture
Japanese junior colleges
1970 establishments in Japan
Aomori (city)